Ernesto Bahena (born 7 November 1961) is a Mexican wrestler. He competed in the men's Greco-Roman 57 kg at the 1984 Summer Olympics.

References

External links
 

1961 births
Living people
Mexican male sport wrestlers
Olympic wrestlers of Mexico
Wrestlers at the 1984 Summer Olympics
Place of birth missing (living people)
Pan American Games medalists in wrestling
Pan American Games silver medalists for Mexico
Wrestlers at the 1983 Pan American Games
20th-century Mexican people
21st-century Mexican people